Erich Wonder (born 30 March 1944) is an Austrian scenic designer and academic teacher who created sets for international stages and festival including the Bayreuth Festival.

Life and career 
Born in Jennersdorf, Burgenland on 30 March 1944, Wonder studied at the Kunstschule Graz from 1960 to 1964, where he attended the painting class of Otto Brunner. He studied stage design at the Akademie der bildenden Künste Wien with Lois Egg from 1965 to 1968. He first worked at assistant stage designer at the Theater Bremen from 1968 to 1971, where  was chief designer, and then at the Schauspiel Frankfurt to 1978.

He created the stage design for the 1994 production of the Bayreuth Festival of Tristan und Isolde, directed by Heiner Müller. In 2000 he designed there the sets for the Millenium Ring of Der Ring des Nibelungen, directed by Jürgen Flimm.

In 1987, he presented with Heiner Goebbels the project Maelstromsüdpol at the documenta 8 in Kassel.

Wonder was professor an der Universität für angewandte Kunst Wien as leader of the masterclass for stage design from 1978. He was professor at the Akademie der bildenden Künste Wien from 1985 to 2012, where he headed the departmentment of scenography at the institute of art and architecture.

In 2006, Wonder designed the trophy of the Faust award.

Further reading 
 Erich Wonder: Bühnenbilder. Hatje Cantz Verlag, 2002
 Erich Wonder: Raum-Szenen / Szenen-Raum. Hatje Cantz Verlag, 1986

References

External links 
 

Austrian scenic designers
1944 births
Living people